Reyhanabad (also Romanized as Reyḩānābād) is a village in Behnampazuki-ye Jonubi Rural District, in the Central District of Varamin County, Tehran Province, Iran. At the 2006 census, its population was 3,858, in 922 families.

References 

Populated places in Varamin County